Broken Homes is the fourth novel in the Peter Grant series by the English author Ben Aaronovitch, published in 2013 by Gollancz.

Plot

Constable Peter Grant and Detective Chief Inspector Nightingale are called to investigate a road traffic accident involving Robert Weil. The investigating officers found human blood from a body in the early state of rigor mortis in his car. Subsequent enquiries lead to a shallow grave containing the body of a young woman killed with and disfigured by a shotgun whose fingers have been removed. Peter initially assumes Weil is a serial killer, but he and Nightingale learn that Weil is on their list of Little Crocodiles, members of an Oxford University dining club who were taught magic by Geoffrey Wheatcroft.

Meanwhile, PC Lesley May, still on indefinite sick leave after suffering a magical attack that resulted in catastrophic facial injuries in Rivers of London, returns to The Folly after her latest round of reconstructive surgery. Nightingale instructs Peter and Lesley in the art of magical staff-making in the hopes of drawing out the Faceless Man.

Sergeant Jaget Kumar calls in Peter to help with a case. Richard Lewis, on the Little Crocodile watch list, committed suicide by train while showing signs of being controlled through magic.

Peter uncovers a rare German Grimoire handed in by a book dealer, who suspected it was stolen. CCTV coverage of the surrounding area leads Peter to the suspected thief, one Patrick Mulhern. Peter pays him a call but finds Mulhern dead by magic.

While the house yields no clues, Mulhern's theft of one of Erik Stromberg's books takes Peter to the architect's home, West Hill House. Skygarden Tower, located in a fictional version of Elephant and Castle, on the site of the real Heygate Estate, is regarded as Stromberg's most significant work. Stromberg habitually sat drinking coffee beside his brass-bound telescope, and Peter uses a spell to see what Stromberg's telescope once revealed: Skygarden Tower in extreme close-up.

Taking a break from investigation to provide a visible police presence, Peter, Lesley, Nightingale and Abigail – as sole member of the Folly's junior wizard outreach programme – attend the Summer Court of the God and Goddess of the River Thames (upper and lower reaches respectively) at Bernie Spain Gardens, doing so in their capacity as keepers of the Queen's peace.

Returning to the plan to bait a trap for the Faceless Man, Peter and Lesley attend a 'Nazareth', or Goblin Market, a mobile event where the fey and magical practitioners meet to do business and socialise. There they recognise Varenka Debroslova, the late Albert Woodville-Gentle's live-in nurse, who attacks them. When Nightingale hears Peter's account and examines the massive property damage she inflicted, he identifies Debroslova as Nochnye Koldunyi or a Night Witch.

Follow-up of leads at Southwark Council convinces the team that there is a connection to Skygarden Tower, so Nightingale informally authorises Peter and Lesley to infiltrate the tower. When Peter finally manages to get into the tower's garden, he discovers river spirit Nicky gamboling with an impish girl wearing a Mary Quant dress and a battered straw hat who plays hide and seek, generally acting more like a child than a woman, who the bemused Peter is convinced is some kind of fey but exactly what kind he can't work out.

Effra explains the impish girl, named Sky, is a tree nymph subject to the seasons, and thus in spring is in a childlike state and not available for interrogation. Peter bridles at this but still manages to establish the tower (which she says makes 'happy music') is being visited by 'lots of lorries'. Peter discovers a book Folly archivist Professor Postmartin thinks significant showed up in connection to Stromberg's library. The title Wege der industriellen Nutzung von Magié (Towards the Industrial Use of Magic) convinces Peter that Stromberg built Skygarden as a magical experiment, but the details remain hazy.

Nightingale reveals Dr Walid has found chimeric cells on the body of the young woman buried near Robert Weil's 'accident'. While Peter's theory fails to convince Nightingale and Lesley (possibly because he uses the simile of a Terry's Chocolate Orange), Peter remains convinced the Stadkrone or 'city crown' is intended to act as a magical relief valve.

Lesley (and Zach) retire for the night while Peter watches TV (with the sound up) until they are all roused by a piercing scream. Donning their Metvests and grabbing collapsible batons, Peter and Lesley rush down to the garden and discover a biker trying to restart a chainsaw to finish ring-barking an ornamental cherry. Throwing the saw at Peter he misses but manages to escape, while Lesley examines Sky, confirming she has died, apparently of natural causes.

In no time, Nicky – resident goddess – arrives distraught and angry, followed by Oberon who appears at the run, sword in hand. Nightingale, warns him against any interfering with the Queen's peace, since this would breach ‘the agreement’. Dr Walid, summoned as the only 'Falcon' competent medical specialist, confirms the man apparently died when his lungs filled with water, but of what kind he can't determine without tests. Peter and Lesley head to Essex to interview the Transit van's owner. Finding the farm given as the owner's address seemingly deserted, Lesley and Peter investigate and discover newly constructed sheds. Leaving with all due, haste Peter and Lesley walk out and into the arms of a pair of thugs, one with a shotgun.

Peter manages to deflect the shotgun so it discharges harmlessly, but the Night Witch arrives and, despite Peter raising a magical shield, effortlessly knocks him down and detains the pair, hoping to ambush Nightingale. At the conclusion of the battle, after the hostages have been rescued, the Night Witch is in custody, and the local force arrives.

Under questioning, the Night Witch, also known as Varvara Sidorovna, explains she was captured during the Great Patriotic War and became a part of the Organisation Todt slave-labour effort to build Hitler's Atlantic Wall. In the confusion that followed the war, she was able to avoid repatriation and obtain genuine identity documents and settled down to live a more or less normal life.

Lesley and Peter return to Skygarden Tower where Peter discovers a recently vacated apartment filled with explosives. Peter and Lesley evacuate the building, with Peter taking the upper floors. On the roof Peter finds the Faceless Man waiting.

Peter directs a magical attack at him which the Faceless Man effortlessly deflects, not understanding he wasn't the intended target, the charges go off and the Stadkrone finally fulfils its intended purpose.

Since the building is in imminent danger of collapse the Faceless Man flees the scene by jumping off the roof. Peter follows and catches the Faceless Man, who is concentrating on magically breaking his own fall and cannot knock Peter off. Upon landing Peter handcuffs the Faceless Man triumphantly. Peter is then tasered in the back by Lesley, who is now working for the Faceless Man, and Peter is left reeling.

Characters

Returning characters
 Police Constable Peter Grant: an officer in the Metropolitan Police and the first official apprentice wizard in sixty years.
 Police Constable Lesley May: an officer in the Metropolitan Police. Currently on medical leave and de facto apprentice to Nightingale
 Detective Chief Inspector Thomas Nightingale: head of the Folly and the last officially sanctioned English Wizard.
 Molly: The Folly's domestic housekeeper, of unknown species. An enthusiastic amateur cook formerly in the hearty English tradition but a convert to the school of Jamie Oliver.
 Dr Abdul Haqq Walid: world-renowned gastroenterologist and cryptopathologist.
 Harold Postmartin D.Phil., F.R.S.: official archivist and historian of English Wizardry, he operates out of the Bodleian Library.
 Abigail Kamara: annoyingly persistent teenaged girl who is the de facto founder member of the Folly's Youth Wing.
 Frank Caffrey: London Fire Brigade Fire Investigator, ex-Parachute Regiment and a key "associate" of the Folly.
 Cecilia Tyburn Thames: a.k.a. Lady Ty, "daughter" of Mama Thames and goddess of the River Tyburn.
 Effra: goddess of the River Effra and by implication presiding deity of Brixton and Kennington.
 Olympia and Chelsea: twin "daughters" of Mamma Thames, goddesses (and party girls) of Counter's Creek and the River Westbourne
 Reynard:  may – or may not – be a were-fox. 
 Oxley: god of the River Oxley one of the "sons" of Father Thames and his chief negotiator.
 Ash: a "son" of Father Thames and god of the River Ash.
 Zachery Palmer (a.k.a. Goblin Boy): itinerant half-fairy merchant, wide boy, chancer and practising cockney.
 Varvara Sidorovna Tamonina (a.k.a. Varenka Dobrosslova): late of the 365th Special Regiment, Red Army. Former 'nurse' (bodyguard) of the late Albert Woodville-Gentle
 The Faceless Man: one-time student of the late Albert Woodville-Gentle (a.k.a. The Faceless Man Mk I)

References

Rivers of London (book series)
2013 British novels
Novels by Ben Aaronovitch
British fantasy novels
Victor Gollancz Ltd books